The individual dressage in equestrian at the 2016 Summer Olympics in Rio de Janeiro was held at National Equestrian Center from 10 - 15 August.

The medals for the competition were presented by Syed Shahid Ali, Pakistan, member of the International Olympic Committee, and the gifts were presented by Maria Gretzer, FEI executive board member.

Competition format
The team and individual dressage competitions used the same results. Dressage had three phases, with the last being used only for the individual event. The first phase was the Grand Prix.  Individuals advanced to the second phase, the Grand Prix Special, if they were on one of the top seven teams or were one of the top 11 remaining competitors.  The top 18 competitors in the Grand Prix Special (ignoring Grand Prix scores) advanced to the final phase, the Grand Prix Freestyle.  The results of that phase (again ignoring previous scores) produced final results.

Schedule
All times are Brasília Time (UTC–3)

Results

References

Individual dressage